The UEFA European Under-21 Championship, the UEFA Under-21 Championship or simply the Euro Under-21, is a biennial football competition contested by the European men's under-21 national teams of the UEFA member associations. Since 1992, the competition also serves as the UEFA qualification tournament for the Summer Olympics.

Italy and Spain are the most successful teams in this competition, having won five titles each. 

Germany are the current champions.

History 

The competition has existed in its current form since 1978. It was preceded by the Under-23 Challenge Cup which ran from 1967 to 1970. A true Under-23 championship was then formed, starting in 1973. The tournament ran parallel to already existing main UEFA youth tournament that existed after the World War II (today the under-19 competitions). Around 1980, the UEFA has been reforming its junior squad competitions and reorganized them based on age limit only.

The age limit was reduced to 21 for the 1978 championship and it has remained so since. To be eligible for the campaign ending in 2023, players need to be born in or after 2000. Many can be actually 23 years old by the time the finals tournament takes place; however, when the qualification process began (2021) all players would have been 21 or under.

Under-21 matches were typically played on the day before senior internationals and where possible, the same qualifying groups and fixtures were played out. This has changed since shortened 2006-2007 Championship.

This tournament serves as qualifier for the Summer Olympics since the 1992 tournament. It has been considered a stepping stone toward the senior team and reducing a political discourse that existed before around the Olympic Games about players' employment status outside of sports. Players such as 2014 World Cup winner Mesut Özil, Klaas-Jan Huntelaar, Luís Figo, Petr Čech, 2010 World Cup winner Iker Casillas, 2006 World Cup winners Francesco Totti, Fabio Cannavaro, Gianluigi Buffon, Alberto Gilardino and Andrea Pirlo, and Euro 2004 winner Georgios Karagounis began their international careers in the youth teams.

Germany are the reigning champions, defeating Portugal 1–0 in the 2021 final. The finals of the 2021 competition were hosted by Hungary and Slovenia.

Format 
Up to and including the 1992 competition, all entrants were divided into eight qualification groups, the eight winners of which formed the quarter-finals lineup. The remaining fixtures were played out on a two-legged, home and away basis to determine the eventual winner.

For the 1994 competition, one of the semi-finalists, France, was chosen as a host for the (single-legged) semi-finals, third-place playoff and final. Similarly, Spain was chosen to host the last four matches in 1996.

For 1998, nine qualification groups were used, as participation had reached 46, nearly double the 24 entrants in 1976. The remaining matches, from the quarter-finals onward, were held in Romania, one of the eight qualifiers.

The 2000 competition also had nine groups, but the nine winners and seven runners-up went into a two-legged playoff to decide the eight qualifiers. From those, Slovakia was chosen as host. For the first time, the familiar finals group stage was employed, with the two winners contesting a final, and two runners-up contesting the third-place playoff. The structure in 2002 was identical, except for the introduction of a semi-finals round after the finals group stage. Switzerland hosted the 2002 finals.

In 2004, ten qualification groups were used, with the group winners and six best runners-up going into the playoff. Germany was host that year. For 2006, the top two teams of eight large qualification groups provided the 16 teams for the playoffs, held in November 2005. Portugal hosted the finals.

Then followed the switch to odd years. The change was made because the senior teams of many nations often chose to promote players from their under-21s team as their own qualification campaign intensified.  Staggering the tournaments allowed players more time to develop in the under-21 team rather than get promoted too early and end up becoming reserves for the seniors.

The 2007 competition actually began before the 2006 finals, with a qualification round to eliminate eight of the lowest-ranked nations. For the first time, the host (Netherlands) was chosen ahead of the qualification section.  As hosts,  qualified automatically. Coincidentally, the Dutch team had won the 2006 competition – the holders would normally have gone through the qualification stage. The other nations were all drawn into fourteen three-team groups. The 14 group winners were paired in double-leg play-off to decide the seven qualifiers alongside the hosts.

From 2009 to 2015, ten qualification groups were used, with the group winners and four best runners-up going into the two-legged playoffs.

The 2015 finals was to be the last eight teams edition, as UEFA expanded the tournament to twelve teams starting from the 2017 edition.

On 6 February 2019, UEFA's Executive Committee increased the number of participants in the finals to sixteen teams, starting from the 2021 edition.

Results

Under-23 championships 
Held only three times before it was relabelled by UEFA.

Under-21 championships

Performances by countries

Comprehensive team results by tournament 
Legend

 – Champions
 – Runners-up
 – Third place
 – Fourth place
 – Semi-finalists

QF – Quarter-finals
GS – Group stage
q – Qualified
 — Hosts

 •  – Did not qualify
 ×  – Did not enter
 ×  – Withdrew before qualification / banned

Notes
1 Includes results representing Yugoslavia and Serbia and Montenegro
2 Includes results representing West Germany
3 Includes results representing Soviet Union and CIS
4 Includes results representing Czechoslovakia

Awards

Player of the Tournament 
The Golden Player award is awarded to the player who plays the most outstanding football during the tournament. Since 2013 an official Player of the Tournament has been selected by the UEFA Technical Team.

Golden Boot
The UEFA European Under-21 Championship adidas Golden Boot award will be handed to the player who scores the most goals during the tournament. Since the 2013 tournament, those who finish as runners-up in the vote receive the Silver Boot and Bronze Boot awards as the second and third top goalscorer players in the tournament respectively.

EURO Under-21 dream team 
On 17 June 2015, UEFA revealed an all-time best XI from the previous Under-21 final tournaments.

See also 
 UEFA European Championship
 UEFA European Under-19 Championship
 UEFA European Under-17 Championship

References

External links 

 
 The Rec.Sport.Soccer Statistics Foundation Contains full record of U-21/U-23 Championships.

 
European Under-21 Championship
Under-21 association football
European youth sports competitions
Recurring sporting events established in 1972
1972 establishments in Europe